"One More Try" is a song by American musician Timmy T. The song was both written and produced by Torres, who was inspired to create the song after breaking up with a girlfriend. Released in October 1990, it topped the US Billboard Hot 100 on March 23, 1991, and entered the top 10 in Belgium, Canada, Germany, the Netherlands (where it reached number one), and Sweden. It was the first single to top the Hot 100 on an independent record label since Lionel Richie's "Truly" in 1982.

Music video
The music video was directed by Alan Calzatti and was shot at Venice, Hollywood, Santa Monica, California.

Track listings

Charts

Weekly charts

Year-end charts

Certifications

Release history

Cover versions
In 2002, German actor Jo Weil released his first single, a cover of One More Try.

See also
 List of Billboard Hot 100 number-one singles of 1991
 Billboard Year-End Hot 100 singles of 1991

References

1990 singles
1990 songs
Billboard Hot 100 number-one singles
Cashbox number-one singles
Dutch Top 40 number-one singles
Quality Records singles
Timmy T songs